Anastasiya Soprunova (born 14 January 1986 in Ust Kamenogorsk) is a Kazakhstani hurdler. At the 2012 Summer Olympics, she competed in the Women's 100 metres hurdles.

Competition record

References

External links
 
 
 
 
 

1986 births
Living people
Sportspeople from Oskemen
Kazakhstani female hurdlers
Olympic athletes of Kazakhstan
Athletes (track and field) at the 2012 Summer Olympics
Athletes (track and field) at the 2010 Asian Games
World Athletics Championships athletes for Kazakhstan
Doping cases in athletics
Kazakhstani sportspeople in doping cases
Asian Games competitors for Kazakhstan
Competitors at the 2009 Summer Universiade
Competitors at the 2011 Summer Universiade
20th-century Kazakhstani women
21st-century Kazakhstani women